This list is an abstract of the musical works of Mandy Capristo. Together with Monrose, she sold more than 3 million Singles and Albums.

Albums

Studio albums

Singles

As solo artist

As featured artist

Other Appearances

Music videos

Other
 Monrose discography

References

Discographies of German artists